The Price of Desire is a 2015 Belgian-Irish biographical drama film directed by Mary McGuckian.

Premise
The film revolves around Eileen Gray's E-1027 villa, one of the first homes Gray designed and also one of the first homes of the modern architecture movement, and Gray's relationship with fellow architect Le Corbusier, who erased Gray's recognition as the author of her work and as one of the most forceful and influential inspirations of modern architecture and design.

Cast
Orla Brady as Eileen Gray
Vincent Perez as Le Corbusier
Francesco Scianna as Jean Badovici
Alanis Morissette as Marisa Damia
Dominique Pinon as Fernand Léger
Tamara Vučković as Louise Dany
Elsa Zylberstein as Romaine Brooks
Anne Lambton as Marie Louise Schelbert
David Herlihy as Aristotle Onassis
Caitriona Balfe as Gabrielle Bloch
Adriana Randall as Charlotte Perriand
Natasha Girardi as Natalie Barney
Marcos Adamantiadis as Gustave Miklos
Hayet Belhalloufi as Mireille Roupest
Ronald Beurms as Jean Paul Rayon
Arnaud Bronsart as Marcel Proust
Pascaline Crêvecoeur as Berenice Abbott
Sammy Leslie as Gertrude Stein
Cherise Silvestri as Evelyn Wild
Tan Win as Seizo Sugawara
François Zachary as Archipenko

Production

In an interview in 2011 for her film Man on the Train, director Mary McGuckian explained that her future project would be the development of the feature film The Price of Desire after finishing working on The Novelist.

The film went into pre-production in 2013, and the film's budget required a loan of €300,000. American actress Shannyn Sossamon was initially cast as Gray, before Orla Brady took over the role.

Part of the film takes place in the authentic French villa of Eileen Gray which she herself designed, E-1027, located in Roquebrune-Cap-Martin. With the villa in disrepair, the producers launched a Kickstarter campaign to help restore the house with Parisian interiors. Art director Anne Seibel, who won the Academy Award for Best Production Design for her work on Midnight in Paris, worked with Emmanuelle Pucci to recreate the aesthetics of the house.

At the beginning of August 2013, filming was done in a studio in Brussels, Belgium.

Filming took place at the end of August on the French Riviera in Roquebrune-Cap-Martin in villa E-1027 as well as around the Roquebrune-Cap-Martin train station.

Postproduction services were provided by Windmill Lane Studios.

Distribution
Entertainment One obtained the rights for distribution the film across Canada and France.

Release
The film premiered at the Dublin International Film Festival in March 2015.

Reception
The film holds a 25% approval rating on review aggregator website Rotten Tomatoes, based on 12 reviews.

References

External links

2015 films
Belgian biographical drama films
Belgian romantic drama films
Irish biographical drama films
Irish romantic drama films
Films set in the 1940s
Films shot in France
Films shot in Brussels
2010s English-language films